W10 may refer to:

Products
 Windows 10, a Microsoft operating system
 Handley Page W.10, a British two- and three-engine medium-range biplane airliner
 Mercedes-Benz W10 (1929–1934), a German automobile
 Pentax Optio W10, a Pentax Optio model of point-and-shoot camera

Other uses
 Mercedes AMG F1 W10 EQ Power+, the Mercedes AMG F1 team's car raced in the 2019 Formula One World Championship.
 W10, a postcode district in the W postcode area of London, England
 , several ships

See also
 West 10 LDN, a BBC drama
 British NVC community W10 (Quercus robur - Pteridium aquilinum - Rubus fruticosus woodland), one of the woodland communities in the British Isles